Berit may refer to:

People
 Berit Andnor (born 1954), Swedish Social Democratic politician
 Berit Brandth (born 1947), Norwegian sociologist and gender researcher
 Berit Brogaard (born 1970), Danish and American philosopher
 Berit Carow (born 1981), German rower
 Berit Christoffersen (born 1973), Danish rower
 Berit Digre (born 1967), Norwegian team handball player and Olympic medalist
 Berit Marie Eira (born 1968), Norwegian Sami reindeer owner and politician
 Berit Granquist (1909–2001), Swedish fencer
 Berit Högman (born 1958), Swedish social democratic politician
 Berit Jóhannesson (born 1946), Swedish Left Party politician
 Berit Lindholm (born 1934), Swedish soprano
 Berit Svendsen (born 1963), Norwegian engineer and business executive
 Berit Wallenberg (1902–1995), Swedish archaeologist, art historian, photographer and philanthropist

Other uses
 Berit Menuchah, a practical kabbalistic work written in the 14th century
 Cyclone Berit, a very strong European windstorm that formed as a tropical wave